Happy Funerals is a 2013 Romanian comedy-drama film directed by Horațiu Mălăele.

Plot
Three heavy boozers - a Romanian (Horatiu Malaele), a Russian (Igor Caras-Romanov) and a Bulgarian (Mihai Gruia Sandu) - are tripling away their... happiness, into vodka, at "The Happy Immigrant", a joint kept by a Turk.

Cast
 Bogdan Mălăele — Translator Vasile
 Oana Ștefănescu — Doamna
 Adrian Ciobanu — Agent asigurări
 Igor Caras-Romanov — Igor
 Sandu Mihai Gruia — Kiril
 Serghei Niculescu-Mizil — Albanezu'
 Constantin Chiriac — Proprietar pompe funebre
 Virginia Rogin — Țiganca
 Dorina Lazăr — Tanti Nela
 Costina Ciuciulică — Educatoarea
 Carol Ionescu — Clachetistul
 Hector Severino — Hector
 Meda Andreea Victor — Mama lui Lionel
 Marius Damian — Șoferul
 Valentin Popescu — Cătălin
 Ruxandra Maniu — Personaj 2
 Valentin Florea — Îngerul
 Coco Paliu — Coco
 Crina Semciuc — Lili
 Maria Obretin — Invitată 2
 Gheorghe Ifrim — Directorul
 Sergiu Costache — Ahmed
 Florin Zamfirescu — Cerșetor
 Ionel Mihăilescu — Manolache
 Letiția Vlădescu — Invitata 1
 Antoaneta Zaharia — Giuseppina
 Maria Teslaru — Jana
 Nicoleta Lefter — Macheuza
 Marius Galea — Lionel la 30 de ani
 Nicolae Stângaciu — Groparul
 Dimitrie Bogomaz — Vaniușka
 Iulian Postelnicu — Doru
 Ștefan Alexa — Individual
 Alin State — Lucian
 Puiu Mircea Lăscuș — Samir
 Vitalie Bantaș — Grișa
 Doinița Ghițescu — Îngrijitoarea
 Cristian Mălăele — Lionel la 14 ani
 Alexandru Bindea — Peppino
 Beatrice Peter — Mercedes
 Mihai Dorobanțu — Polițist Șoimulescu
 Adhiambo Rose Beatrice — Jewel
 Dan Rădulescu — Lionel la 20 de ani
 Cuzin Toma — Tatăl lui Lionel
 Roxana Guttman — Rashida
 Sorin Dobrin — Arlechin 1
 Ilinca Manolache — Secretară de platou
 Horațiu Mălăele — Lionel
 Corneliu Jipa — Preotul
 Maggie Edimoh — Cindy
 Bogdan Cotleț — Marcel
 Adriana Șchiopu — Locatara
 Tudorel Filimon — Colegul
 Mihai Niță — Arlechin 2
 Alexandru Georgescu — Polițist Porumbel
 Andreea Samson — Lavinia

References

External links  
 

2013 films
Romanian comedy-drama films
2013 comedy-drama films